Odstone is a hamlet and former civil parish, now in the parish of Shackerstone, in the Hinckley and Bosworth district of Leicestershire, England. It stands on a marked promontory of high ground between two river valleys. In 1931 the parish had a population of 142.

The village appears in the Domesday Book as Odeston, meaning either "Odd's farm or village", or "settlement on the protruding piece of land", oddr being the Old Norse for "point". Many local towns and villages share a similar Scandinavian heritage.

Odstone became a parish in 1866, on 1 April 1935 the parish was abolished and merged with Shackerstone.

References

External links
Website for the people of Odstone

Hamlets in Leicestershire
Former civil parishes in Leicestershire
Shackerstone